Peter Bland (born 12 May 1934 in Scarborough, North Yorkshire)
 is a British-New Zealand poet and actor.

Life
He emigrated to New Zealand at the age of 20 and graduated from the Victoria University of Wellington.

He worked as a radio producer for the New Zealand Broadcasting Corporation.

He became closely associated with the Wellington Group which included James K. Baxter and Louis Johnson.  He worked in theatre, as co-founder and artistic director of Downstage Theatre from 1964–68.

He returned to Britain in 1970 for a short time but now lives in Auckland, New Zealand.

Awards and honours
 1977 Cholmondeley Award
 Arvon Foundation International Poetry Competition, England
 2011 Prime Minister's Awards for Literary Achievement

Works

Poetry

Plays
 Father’s Day (Wellington, 1966; the first locally-written production at Downstage Theatre)
 George the Mad Ad Man (Wellington, 1967, and Coventry, England, 1969).

Film Acting
 A Touch of the Other (1970)
 Don't Just Lie There, Say Something! (1974)
 Dangerous Orphans (1985)
 Came a Hot Friday (1985)
 Queen City Rocker (1986)

Memoir

References

External links
 "Bland, Peter", New Zealand Book Council
 "Bland, Peter", doollee

1934 births
Living people
British poets
New Zealand poets
New Zealand male writers
Victoria University of Wellington alumni
Actors from Scarborough, North Yorkshire
Male actors from Yorkshire
British male poets